ʻAbd al-Wadūd (ALA-LC romanization of ) is a male Muslim given name. It is built from the Arabic words ʻabd and al-Wadūd, one of the names of God in the Qur'an, which give rise to the Muslim theophoric names. It means "servant of the all-loving".

Alternative transliterations include Abdul Wadood, Abdel Wadoud and others, all subject to variable spacing and hyphenation. The name may refer to:

Abdul Wadud (musician) (1947−2022), American jazz & symphonic cellist
Abu Musab Abdel Wadoud (1970−2020), Algerian militant emir
Abdul Wadud Sardar
Abdul Wadud (officer)
Abdul Wadud Khan

References

Arabic masculine given names